Crashing Gates is an EP by Kevin Max, released on December 9, 2008 on iTunes Store. It is a continuation of The Imposter—"a more focused collection of songs about the Apocalypse."

According to Max, Universal (dPulse's parent label) considered releasing a "full package with added songs" in 2009. The "full package," Cotes d'Armor, was eventually released in 2010 and featured five new songs in addition to remixes of the seven on Crashing Gates.

Track listing 
 "Traveler" – 4:35
 "Baby, I'm Your Man" – 3:39
 "The Saint of Lonely Hearts" – 2:07
 "Future Love Song" – 5:51
 "Out of the Wild" – 3:42
 "Crashing Gates and Passing Keepers" – 6:11
 "Your Beautiful Mind 2009" – 4:14

Personnel 
 Kevin Max – vocals, keyboards
 Erick Cole – guitars
 Cary Barlowe – guitars
 Jonathan Smith (a.k.a. TheRealJonSmith) – acoustic piano, synthesizers, electric guitars, bass, drums, percussion, producer, recording, mixing
 Abigail Johnson – backing vocals on "Baby, I'm Your Man"
source:

References 

Kevin Max albums
2008 EPs